365 Kadhal Kadithangal is a 2010 Indian Tamil language romantic drama film directed by N. Pandian. The film stars Yuva Karthik, Ajay and Karthika, with Karunas, Radha Ravi, Devan, Singamuthu, Bava Lakshmanan, Muthukaalai and Sampath Ram playing supporting roles. The film, produced by Salai Maitri, had musical score by Paul J. and was released on 17 September 2010.

Plot

The film begins with Subbu (Ajay) killing Suruli (Sampath Ram) in Kodaikanal and he starts remembering his past.

In 1992, Subbu (Yuva Karthik) was a carefree secondary school student and lived with his strict father and sawmill labourer Rasu Thevar (Radha Ravi). Jasmine who came from Madras joined his school and became his classmate, her father Williams (Devan) was a wealthy businessman. Subbu fell in love with her at first sight and he tried to woo her but Jasmine didn't reciprocate his love and she preferred to be friends with Subbu. Jasmine even helped him pass the plus two exam. At the close of the school year, Jasmine returned to Madras with her parents.

Back to the present, doctors have given up their hopes on Jasmine who is now a coma patient. Her parents are left with no options other than mercy-killing her but Subbu believes that he can bring her back to normalcy and he takes her with him.

In 1992, Rasu Thevar died after a workplace accident and Subbu ended up without money. Subbu decided to not go to college and he got his father's job. One day, Subbu found Jasmine's letter stating the address of her new home and he wrote love letters to his sweetheart every day for a year. In the meantime, Jasmine joined a college in Madras and Subbu's love letters were intercepted by her mother Elizabeth (Usha Elizabeth). Six years later, Jasmine, who had a decent job that paid well, returned to Kodaikanal for her holidays and she came to know about the love letters sent by Subbu. Jasmine was in shock that Subbu was still in love with her and she advised him to forget her. In the meantime, Suruli who was Subbu's enemy hit Jasmine with his car and she fell into a coma.

Back to the present, Williams lodges a complaint against Subbu for taking Jasmine with him and the court orders Subbu to leave her to Williams. When Williams takes her home from him, Subbu shoots himself in the head and Jasmine finally wakes up.

Cast

Yuva Karthik as Teenager Subbu
Ajay as Adult Subbu
Karthika as Jasmine
Karunas as Murugan
Radha Ravi as Rasu Thevar
Devan as Williams
Singamuthu as Sawmill owner
 Bava Lakshmanan as Head constable
Muthukaalai as Mental
Sampath Ram as Suruli
Devendran as Oomai
Boys Rajan as Doctor
V. M. Subburaj
Vijay Ganesh
Regi
Usha Elizabeth as Elizabeth
Minnal Deepa as Gomathi

Production
N. Pandian who had directed the film Priyam (1996) returned with 365 Kadhal Kadithangal under the banner of Vision 21 Creative Team Works. The director said, "This will be a heart-touching love story between a girl and boy that has extended from their school days to the present age. The school days are narrated in flashback and how the guy revives his love by writing love letters to his sweetheart every day (365 days) when he misses her". Two different actors were chosen for the lead role, Ajay did the role of the present-day youngster while debutant Yuva Karthik took on the role of young school-going student. Karthika Adaikalam will be spotted in both the roles. The film was set in backdrops of Kodaikanal so as to offer a colorful touch to the romantic story but the major portions were shot in Ooty and Kotagiri.

Soundtrack

The soundtrack was composed by Paul J.. The soundtrack features 6 tracks and it was released on 13 December 2009 by T. Rajendar with Silambarasan receiving it.

References

2010 films
2010s Tamil-language films
2010 romantic drama films
Indian romantic drama films
Films shot in Ooty
Indian nonlinear narrative films